Enjoy is a 2021 British short film directed by Saul Abraham. The film explores male mental health following a home tutor who is struggling to navigate his job and his depression. Enjoy was filmed in the United Kingdom and has been presented in a number of festivals, including the Raindance Film Festival, Aspen Shortsfest 2022 and Tribeca Film Festival where it premiered in 2021.

Plot 
Michael (Himesh Patel) battles with his spiralling depression, which impacts his romantic relationship and his job as a home tutor to the struggling pre-teen Archibald (Tom Sweet).

Reception 
Since its launch, the film has been selected in various festivals around the world:

References

External links 
 Enjoy on IMDb.
 Official Trailer on YouTube.

2021 films
2021 short films
British short films
Films about mental health